Stitz is a surname. Notable people with the surname include:

 Hermann Stitz (1868–1947), German biologist and entomologist
 Ilka Stitz (born 1960), German writer of historical thrillers
 Norma Stitz, website entrepreneur and fetish model

See also
 Stits, surname